Charles Albert Ginnever (August 28, 1931 – June 16, 2019), was an American sculptor known primarily for large-scale abstract steel sculptures that defy simple understanding, as the works seem to constantly change form as one moves around them in time and space.

Early life

Charles Albert Ginnever was born in San Mateo, California, August 28, 1931. In 1953 he traveled to Paris, where he attended classes taught by the sculptor Ossip Zadkine at the Académie de la Grande Chaumière. His European tour lasted two years, during which time he travelled throughout France and Italy and absorbed as much as he could from the many museums he visited. Upon returning to his native California, he enrolled at the California School of Fine Arts, (now the San Francisco Art Institute) where he studied photography and sculpture from 1955 to 1957, and where he befriended the sculptor Peter Forakis.

1957 was a pivotal year for Ginnever, when he drove from San Francisco to New York with fellow sculptor Mark di Suvero. On the week-long cross-country journey, Ginnever and di Suvero spent their time discussing abstract expressionism and concluded that sculpture "hadn't matched the accomplishments in painting", and they were determined to correct that. Dropping di Suvero off in New York City, Ginnever continued on to Cornell University, where he had accepted a teaching position and where he simultaneously completed his MFA in 1959. It was during this period that Ginnever, inspired by calligraphy, made such seminal works as Oxbow, Calligraphic Sculpture, and Ithaca, all incorporating found materials such as wood, railroad ties and steel, which not only marked his departure from the "carve-direct/modeling orientation to sculpture" from which he and di Suvero initially evolved, but paved the way to a new form of sculptural expression where sculpture not only occupied space but, according to Carter Ratcliff, did so by "reaching into it". This would prove to be the defining moment in Ginnever's career when his sculpture would eliminate its reliance on the pedestal or base.

After the incorporation of found, bent steel pieces in his railroad tie sculpture of 1959 entitled Ithaca, which he started while still at Cornell and completed after moving to New York City, steel became the primary medium for his work, and has remained so ever since.

1960s 
In the early 1960s, Ginnever's sculpture, much like that of his acquaintance and contemporary John Chamberlain, included "buckled and crunched automobile skins – hoods and fenders – combined with warped, distorted skeletal members of demolished buildings" and in Ginnever's case, sometimes incorporating painted fabric. But, whereas Chamberlain relied on the color of the found metal objects for their color composition, Ginnever painted his pieces to achieve their color compositions (a technique that Chamberlain would utilize in his later pieces).  Also, whereas Chamberlain's pieces relied on their forms being crunched and are somewhat static, Ginnever's incorporated open volumes delineated by the sculptures' elements which included crunched steel.  The combination of open and closed forms in Ginnever's sculptures then becomes animated by the viewer's participation when walking around the piece.

The idea of the viewer as an active participant was brought to its apex in the "Happening", an art form whose name was coined by artist Allan Kaprow.  In 1962, Ginnever produced and directed Ergo Suits, a "multimedia many-act event, best described as a 'happening'", that was held first in Woodstock and then Bridgehampton, New York in the same summer.  Among the many artists and performers Ginnever invited to participate in his artist carnival were Allan Kaprow, Walter de Maria, Peter Forakis, Tom Doyle, Eva Hesse, and the Bread and Puppet Theater.  One of the many events of Ginnever's artist carnival included a "Sculpture Dance", in which Ginnever, Tom Doyle and Eva Hesse took part, and each of the artists made their own wearable sculptures. This event marked Hesse's first sculpture  and Ginnever's first foray into the art of Happenings.

The sixties saw the emergence of both Minimal and Conceptual art, among other important art movements and although Ginnever's own work does not fall under the rubric of those movements, he was an active participant in them.  In 1968, while head of the art department at Windham College in Vermont, Ginnever invited artists Carl Andre, Robert Barry and Lawrence Weiner to create site-specific outdoor works that were exhibited on the campus of the college.  The exhibition included a symposium hosted by Ginnever and moderated by Dan Graham, in which the artists were given the opportunity to speak about their work.  This event, transcribed and disseminated throughout the art world by the freelance curator Seth Siegelaub, had lasting effects on the movement and marked important milestones in the careers of the artists who participated. Known as "The Windham Show," it was the first commissioned conceptual art exhibit in the United States.

1970s 
Ginnever's 1964-65 sculpture Dante's Rig, his first made from purchased materials, marked another important turning point in his career and set the stage for much of his later work.  According to Carol Squiers, "Dante's Rig explored non-western art ideas, especially about perspective," and "spawned a series of pieces based on the support system itself, and another series based on the aluminum sections, which foreshadowed his interest in 'forced illusory perspective'".  From Dante's Rig, one can clearly see a linear progression in his major works from the 1970s and 1980s.  Squiers goes on to say, By solidifying the negative space in Fayette, 1966-71, Ginnever produced Détente, 1974.  In the same way, by heightening the Renaissance perspective of the framework of Ithaca, he made Zeus, 1975, and Wakanhdi, 1976.  Three Steel Plates, 1977, is a combination of both these derivations.  Three cor-ten steel plates, each 5/8" X 5' X 22', are hung from steel cables and shackled together in a zigzag pattern.  Each touches the floor at one end and then angles up, recalling both the slanted negative space of his "squashed box" pieces (Fayette, Troika), and the exaggerated perspectival lunges of Zeus and Wakanhdi, which extend and flatten space all at once.  The sheets, poised on one point, each deceptively deny their own extreme weight.

By the late 1970s, Ginnever was also among the first members of ConStruct, the artist-owned gallery that promoted and organized large-scale sculpture exhibitions throughout the United States.  Other founding members included John Raymond Henry, Kenneth Snelson, Lyman Kipp and Mark di Suvero.

Ginnever has been preoccupied with the notion of western perspective for many years, and continuously challenges the viewers of his work in this respect.  Ginnever states, "The sculpture is not made to trick anybody.  It's just that [in] the way they are placed, they challenge our perception.  Renaissance perspective was invented to help painters and draftsman extend the appearance of depth on the picture plane.  Perspective has nothing to do with how forms of sculpture actually appear.  Yet we expect things to behave in a certain way, which my sculptures intentionally refuse to do." As Mary Maggini points out in a catalogue essay about Ginnever's work, by "manipulating the appearance of depth and dimension, movement, and space", Ginnever presents the viewer with "a different work of art that vacillates between flattening into a one dimensional plane to expanding, or sometimes exploding, into three dimensions." Thus, when walking around one of Ginnever's sculptures, viewers are challenged when what they thought they would see at another viewpoint turns out to be a completely different form from what they expected, and they are left questioning if they are even viewing the same piece.

Later work 
Most of Ginnever's sculptures since the early 1990s are capable of assuming multiple positions while retaining their integrity in each position. Writing about these works, J.R. Leibowitz states, "An artist reviewing the Ginnever sculpture would immediately recognize that it works in every direction; in any pose, artistic weight is balanced."  One such piece, entitled Rashomon, is capable of assuming 15 different positions.  Titled after a film by Akira Kurosawa that tells the same story four times from four distinct perspectives, Ginnever's Rashomon "slips from whatever mental grasp of it a viewer may have won" whenever it is placed in a new position.

In 2000, Kenneth Baker sums up Ginnever's work for the past three decades by stating, "His intention for Rashomon is as elemental as its design.  In a society in which the integration of space and time is consigned to the realm of idea rather than that of direct physical experience, the work proposes to return human perception to its original state." In a 2012 review, Baker described Rashomon as "the best unheralded idea of the twentieth century."

Death
Ginnever continued to work on sculpture, drawings and printmaking, primarily at the studios on his sculpture farm in Putney, Vermont. He died there on June 16, 2019.

Education/Distinctions

1949–51 San Mateo Junior College, San Mateo, California, A.A. 
1953 	Alliance Francaise, Paris, France 
1954 	Universita per Stranieri, Perugia, Italy 
1953–55 Academie de la Grande Chaumiere, Paris, France under Ossip Zadkine 
1955 	Atelier 17, Paris, France, under Stanley W. Hayter 
1955–57 California School of Fine Arts (San Francisco Art Institute), B.A. 
1957–59 Cornell University, Ithaca, NY, M.F.A.

Large Works

United States

Arizona

 Untitled, 1987, Private collection, Paradise Valley

California

 Ascension, 1990, Private collection, Los Angeles
 Bop, 1980, Foss Creek Pathway, Healdsburg (on loan)
 Canada, 1989, Private collection, Los Angeles
 Chicago Triangles, 1979, Littlefield Center, Stanford
 Cobra, 1984, Triton Museum of Art, Santa Clara (on loan)
 Crab, 1982, diRosa Collection, Sonoma
 Crazed, 1980, Foss Creek Pathway, Healdsburg (on loan)
 Dementia, 1989/98, Voigt Family Foundation, Geyserville (on loan)
 Didymous, 1987, Runnymede Sculpture Farm, Woodside
 Gemini, 1987, Bedford Properties
 Geyserville Zip, 2005, Voigt Family Foundation, Geyserville
 Gyro I, 1982, Voigt Family Foundation, Geyserville (on loan)
 Hangover II, 1982, Juilliard Park, Santa Rosa (on loan)
 Heavy Metal, 1983, Swift Realty, Concord
 Ibis, 1987, Runnymede Sculpture Farm, Woodside
 Kitsune, 1990, Runnymede Sculpture Farm, Woodside
 Low Rider, 1984, Fisher Collection, Atherton
 Luna Moth Walk I, 1982, Meyer Library, Stanford University
 Luna Moth Walk I, Verso, 1983, Luna Moth Walk II, 1985, and Luna Moth Walk III, 1981, Voigt Family Foundation, Geyserville (on loan)
 Pas de Deux (bronze), Voigt Family Foundation, Geyserville
 Pas de Deux (steel), 1991, Hawkwood Farm, Petaluma (on loan)
 Python, 1980, Runnymede Sculpture Farm, Woodside
 Rashomon (3 units), 1998, Di Rosa Collection, Napa
 San Mateo Bridge, 1978, City of San Mateo
 Slant Rhyme #17, Private collection, Tiburon
 Slant Rhyme Series #20, 1992, San Jose Institute of Contemporary Art, San Jose (on loan)
 Split II, 1987, Koll-Bernal Associates, Pleasanton
 Squared, 1986, Private Collection, Fullerton
 Squared II, 1987, Koll Center, Bernal Corporate Park, Pleasanton
 Stack, 1985, Hughes Aircraft, Los Angeles
 Stretch II, 1985, Orange County Museum of Art, Newport Beach
 Tandem, 1969/89, UCSF Medical Center, San Francisco (on loan)
 The Three Graces, 1975–81, Littlefield Center, Stanford
 Troika, 1976, San Francisco Museum of Modern Art, San Francisco
 Untitled, 1980, Private collection, San Francisco
 Untitled, 1985, Private collection, Atherton
 Untitled (In Homage to My Father), 1985, Palo Alto
 Virgo, 1986, Private collection, Santa Monica
 Zeus II, 1992, Runnymede Sculpture Farm, Woodside

Colorado

 Rashomon (3 units), 1993/98, Private collection, Evergreen
 Rashomon (prototype), 1993/98, Private collection, Colorado Springs

Connecticut

 Charities, 1975/80, Westport Library, Jesup Green, Westport
 White Flat, 1963, Wadsworth Athenaeum, Hartford

District of Columbia

 Ascension II, 1991, Metropolitan Square
 Maquette for Protagoras, 1976, National Museum of American Art, Smithsonian Institution, Washington
 Midas & Fog, 1966, Private collection
 Untitled, 1968, Hirshhorn Museum and Sculpture Garden, Washington
 Untitled (Squares), 1968, Hirshhorn Museum and Sculpture Garden, Washington
 Untitled, 1968, National Museum of American Art, Smithsonian Institution, Washington

Florida

 Forth Bridge, 1979, Private collection, Miami
 Half Stretch, 1982, American University
 Hangover, 1982, Martin Z. Margulies collection (on loan), Miami Dade College - Kendall Campus, Miami

Illinois

 Blue and Black, 1979, Park 470 Foundation, Chicago
 Icarus, 1975, Nathan Manilow Sculpture Park, Governor's State University, University Park

Louisiana

 The Bird (for Charlie Parker), 1979, K & B Corporation, New Orleans

Massachusetts

 Texas Triangles, 1983, DeCordova Museum and Sculpture Park, Lincoln
 Untitled, Private collection, Lowell

Michigan

 Daedalus, 1977, University of Michigan Museum of Art, Ann Arbor

Minnesota

 Model for Nautilus, 1976, Walker Art Center, Minneapolis
 Nautilus, 1976, Walker Art Center, Minneapolis
 Protagoras, 1976, General Services Administration, U.S. Courthouse, St. Paul
 Rubenstein, 1984, James Ford Bell Research Center, General Mills, Inc., Minneapolis

Missouri

 Crete, 1978, Laumeier International Sculpture Park, St. Louis
 Knossos, 1990, Nelson Atkins Museum, Kansas City

Nebraska

 Shift, 1985, Sheldon Memorial Art Museum and Sculpture Garden, Lincoln

Nevada

 Gallop-a-Pace, 1979, City of Reno
 Slant Rhyme #18, 1993, Private collection, Lake Tahoe

New Jersey

 Marcel's Wave, Private collection, Lebanon
 Scorpio, 1990, Grounds for Sculpture, Hamilton

New Mexico

 Troika II, 2008, Private collection, Santa Fe

New York

 3+1, 1967, Metropolitan Museum of Art, New York
 1971, 1971, Storm King Art Center, Mountainville
 Apollo, 1985, ART OMI (on loan)
 Atlantis, 1981, State University of New York, Buffalo
 Fayette: For Charles and Medgar Evers, 1971, Storm King Art Center, Mountainville
 Koronos, 1978, SUNY, Purchase
 Prospect Mountain Project (For David Smith), 1979, Storm King Art Center, Mountainville
 Slant Rhyme #21, 1993, Private collection, Poundridge
 Untitled, 1970, Private collection, Woodstock
 Walkabout, 1987, Private collection, Poundridge

North Carolina

 Dovecotes, 1972, City of Winston-Salem

Ohio

 Dansa, 1981, Cleveland Lakefront State Park, Cleveland
 Movin' on for Jesse Owens, 1980, Dave Hall Plaza, Dayton
 Split II, 1973, Hobart Urban Nature Preserve, Troy

Oregon

 Tie, 1969, Private collection, Portland

Pennsylvania

 Abacus, 1968, Private collection, Bryn Mawr
 Detente, 1974, Private collection, Chester Springs
 Stretch, 1980–81, Hartwood Acres Park, Allegheny County

Texas

 Pisa, 1984, Spring Valley Center Management, SVC Leasing & Management, Dallas, Texas
 Pueblo Bonito, 1974–77, Knox Triangle, Houston
 Troika, 1978, Science and Research Building 2, University of Houston, Houston

Vermont

 4 the 5th (of Beethoven), 1972, Landmark College, Putney (on loan)
 30 outdoor installations, Artist's farm, Westminster

Washington

 Azuma, 1987, Walla Walla Foundry, Walla Walla (on loan)
 Les Funambules, 1988, Private Collection, Belleview
 Oxbow, 1959/2011, Walla Walla
 Troika, 1976–77, Seattle Art Museum, Seattle

West Virginia

 Charleston Arch, 1980, U.S. Post Office, Charleston

Wisconsin

 Olympus, 1976, Lynden Sculpture Garden, Milwaukee

Wyoming

 Ayatollah II, 2009, Private collection, Teton Village
 Slant Rhyme 5A, 1994, Private collection, Teton Village
 Steel Squared, 1983, Private collection, Teton Village
 Steel Squared, 1986, Private collection,  Jackson Hole

International

Australia

 Green Mountain Blue II, 1978, Australian National Gallery, Canberra
 Midas II, 1978, Vaucluse, New South Wales

Philippines

 Nike, 1996, APEC Sculpture Garden, PICC, Manila

Other Work

 Calligraphic Sculpture, 1958
 Dante's Rig, 1964–65
 Ghost of Isenheim, 1961
 Godard's Dream, 1982
 Gothic Series #1, 1965
 Ithaca, 1959
 Koronos II, 1978
 Lavade (for Linda), 1974
 M.P. #2, 2005
 M.P. #3, 2005
 Mobius #1, 2005
 Moonwalker I, 1989
 Moonwalker IV, 1991
 Moonwalker V, 1991
 Moonwalker VI, 1991
 No Place to Hide, 1986
 Satellite (for Ronald Bladen), 1987
 Stack, 1985
 Tandem II, 1980
 Three Steel Plates, 1977
 Torque, 1990
 Untitled, 1966
 Untitled, 1971
 Untitled (A/P), 1986
 Untitled, Herculoy, 1986
 Wakanhdi, 1975
 Zeus, 1975

References

External links
Official Charles Ginnever Website
A Question of Perspective : Sculpture by Charles Ginnever at Sculpture.org
Green Mountain Blue II by Charles Ginnever, collection of the National Gallery of Australia
The World According to Charles Ginnever : Review by John Yau at hyperallergic.com

1931 births
2019 deaths
People from San Mateo, California
Sculptors from California
Cornell University College of Architecture, Art, and Planning alumni
Abstract sculptors
20th-century American sculptors
20th-century American male artists
21st-century American sculptors
21st-century American male artists